Final Run can refer to:

Final Run (1999 film) (1999), a Canadian television film directed by Armand Mastroianni and starring Robert Urich.
Final Run (TV series) (1988), a UK series directed by Tim King.
Final Run (1989 film) (Mu zhong wu ren) (1989), also known as Final Run, Kickboxer or Jackie Chan's Second Strike, a Hong Kong film directed by Phillip Ko.
Final Run (2012 game), a video game for iOS, developed by Dutch games studio Rotor games.